Jane Cheryl Hansen is a New Zealand model and beauty queen who was crowned Miss International 1971.

Hansen became the first, and up to now the only, Miss New Zealand to win the Miss International crown. She was among the 50 delegates who competed in the pageant when it was held in Long Beach, California.

References

Miss International winners
Living people
New Zealand beauty pageant winners
Miss International 1971 delegates
Year of birth missing (living people)